Gerhard Johan Nortier (born 4 March 1989 in George, South Africa) is a South African rugby union player for the Slava Moscow in Russia. His regular position is fly-half.

Career

Youth and Varsity rugby

Nortier represented the South Western Districts at youth level, playing for them at the Under-16 Grant Khomo Week in 2005 and the Under-18 Craven Week tournaments in 2006 and 2007.

He played for the  side in the 2008 Under-19 Provincial Championship competition and for the  side in the Under-21 competitions in 2009 and 2010.

He also played Varsity Cup rugby for the Potchefstroom-based university , representing them in the 2012 and 2013 editions of the tournament. In 2012, he played in all 8 matches for the NWU Pukke and finished as joint second top points scorer in the competition – just one point behind ' Wesley Dunlop – and in 2013, he finished third.

Senior career

After his successful season in the 2012 Varsity Cup, Nortier was included in the  squad for the 2012 Vodacom Cup competition.

However, he returned in style during the 2014 Vodacom Cup competition, where he finished as the ' top points scorer scoring 79 points in his seven starts.

References

South African rugby union players
Living people
1989 births
Rugby union fly-halves
People from George, South Africa
Leopards (rugby union) players
Rugby union players from the Western Cape